Amarbir Singh "Jimmy" Hansra (born 29 December 1984) is a Canadian cricketer born in Ludhiana, India.

He is a middle-order batsman and occasional offspinner. He began playing cricket at a very young age at school, and had an interest in the sport throughout his childhood. He has said that his father, who also has a passion for cricket, laid the foundations for his profound interest in cricket.

Hansra was announced as captain for the Canada national cricket team starting his captaincy for the ICC Americas' T20 Tournament taking place 17–25 July 2011 in Fort Lauderdale, Florida, where he proved his worth by winning the tournament.

References

External links
Jimmy Hansra on ESPNcricinfo

Canadian cricketers
1984 births
Indian emigrants to Canada
Canadian people of Punjabi descent
Canadian sportspeople of Indian descent
Cricketers from Ludhiana
Living people
Punjabi people
Cricketers at the 2011 Cricket World Cup
Canadian Sikhs
Canada One Day International cricketers
Canada Twenty20 International cricketers
Indian cricketers